Jyri Göran Kjäll (born 13 January 1969) is a Finnish former boxer who won the bronze medal in the light welterweight division at the 1992 Summer Olympics. A year later he captured the silver medal at the 1993 World Amateur Boxing Championships in Tampere, Finland.

Kjäll turned pro in 1994, moved to Florida, and had limited success. Although he retired in 2002 with a career record with 23-1-0 with 18 KO's and fought frequently in the US, his career never built up momentum for a title shot. His lone defeat was a 1st-round TKO to future contender Juan Carlos Candelo.

References

External links 
 
Profile on Scandinavian Boxing
 Profile

1969 births
Living people
People from Seinäjoki
Light-welterweight boxers
Boxers at the 1992 Summer Olympics
Olympic boxers of Finland
Olympic bronze medalists for Finland
Olympic medalists in boxing
Finnish male boxers
AIBA World Boxing Championships medalists
Medalists at the 1992 Summer Olympics
Finnish expatriate sportspeople in the United States
Sportspeople from South Ostrobothnia